Florencio Serrano (born September 18, 1999) is a Filipino professional basketball player for the Phoenix Super LPG Fuel Masters of the Philippine Basketball Association (PBA).

Professional career

Pampanga Delta (2020–2021)
Serrano joined the Pampanga Delta in the NBL (Philippines).

Phoenix Super LPG Fuel Masters (2022–present)
Serrano was selected 19th overall pick by the Phoenix Super LPG Fuel Masters in the 2022 PBA draft.

References

1999 births
Living people
De La Salle Green Archers basketball players
Basketball players from Pampanga
Filipino men's basketball players
Phoenix Super LPG Fuel Masters draft picks
Phoenix Super LPG Fuel Masters players
Shooting guards
Point guards